This is a list of area codes in the province of British Columbia:

604: Created in 1947 as British Columbia's original area code.  The current numbering plan area comprises the City of Vancouver, the Lower Mainland, Sunshine Coast, Howe Sound and lower Fraser Valley.
250: Split in 1996 from 604, serves most of British Columbia including Vancouver Island; excludes area served by 604.
778: Created in 2001 as overlay for Vancouver and the lower Fraser Valley; extended to entire province in 2007.
236: Created in 2001 (effective 2013); overlays all of British Columbia.
672: Created in 2011 (effective 2019); overlays all of British Columbia.

References

See also 

 Telephone numbers in Canada
 Canadian Numbering Administration Consortium

British Columbia
Area codes
Area codes